The  singles Tournament at the 2006 Zurich Open took place between 16 October and 23 October on the indoor hard courts of the Hallenstadion in Zürich, Switzerland. Maria Sharapova won the title, defeating Daniela Hantuchová in the final.

Seeds

Draw

Finals

Top half

Bottom half

External links
WTA draws

2006 Singles
Zurich Open - Singles